Electron transfer (ET) occurs when an electron relocates from an atom or molecule to another such chemical entity. ET is a mechanistic description of certain kinds of redox reactions involving transfer of electrons. 

Electrochemical processes are ET reactions.  ET reactions are relevant to photosynthesis and respiration and commonly involve transition metal complexes. In organic chemistry ET is a step in some commercial polymerization reactions. It is foundational to photoredox catalysis.

Classes of electron transfer

Inner-sphere electron transfer

In inner-sphere ET, the two redox centers are covalently linked during the ET. This bridge can be permanent, in which case the electron transfer event is termed intramolecular electron transfer.  More commonly, however, the covalent linkage is transitory, forming just prior to the ET and then disconnecting following the ET event.  In such cases, the electron transfer is termed intermolecular electron transfer.  A famous example of an inner sphere ET process that proceeds via a transitory bridged intermediate is the reduction of [CoCl(NH3)5]2+ by [Cr(H2O)6]2+.  In this case, the chloride ligand is the bridging ligand that covalently connects the redox partners.

Outer-sphere electron transfer

In outer-sphere ET reactions, the participating redox centers are not linked via any bridge during the ET event.  Instead, the electron "hops" through space from the reducing center to the acceptor.  Outer sphere electron transfer can occur between different chemical species or between identical chemical species that differ only in their oxidation state.  The latter process is termed self-exchange.  As an example, self-exchange describes the degenerate reaction between permanganate and its one-electron reduced relative manganate:

[MnO4]− + [Mn*O4]2− → [MnO4]2− + [Mn*O4]−
 
In general, if electron transfer is faster than ligand substitution, the reaction will follow the outer-sphere electron transfer.

Often occurs when one/both reactants are inert or if there is no suitable bridging ligand.

A key concept of Marcus theory is that the rates of such self-exchange reactions are mathematically related to the rates of "cross reactions".  Cross reactions entail partners that differ by more than their oxidation states.  One example (of many thousands) is the reduction of permanganate by iodide to form iodine and, again, manganate.

Five steps of an outer sphere reaction

 Reactants diffuse together, forming an "encounter complex", out of their solvent shells => precursor complex  (requires work =wr)
 Changing bond lengths, reorganize solvent => activated complex
 Electron transfer
 Relaxation of bond lengths, solvent molecules => successor complex
 Diffusion of products (requires work=wp)

Heterogeneous electron transfer
In heterogeneous electron transfer, an electron moves between a chemical species and a solid-state electrode.  Theories addressing heterogeneous electron transfer have applications in electrochemistry and the design of solar cells.

Vectoral electron transfer
Especially in proteins, electron transfer often involves hopping of an electron from one redox-active center to another. The hopping pathway, which is viewed as a vector, guides and facilitates ET within an insulating matrix. Typical redox centers are iron-sulfur clusters, e.g. the 4Fe-4S ferredoxins. These site are often separated by 7-10 Å, a distance compatible with fast outer-sphere ET.

Theory
The first generally accepted theory of ET was developed by Rudolph A. Marcus to address outer-sphere electron transfer and was based on a transition-state theory approach.  The Marcus theory of electron transfer was then extended to include inner-sphere electron transfer by Noel Hush and Marcus.  The resultant theory called Marcus-Hush theory, has guided most discussions of electron transfer ever since.  Both theories are, however, semiclassical in nature, although they have been extended to fully quantum mechanical treatments by Joshua Jortner, Alexander M. Kuznetsov, and others proceeding from Fermi's golden rule and following earlier work in non-radiative transitions.  Furthermore, theories have been put forward to take into account the effects of vibronic coupling on electron transfer; in particular, the PKS theory of electron transfer. In proteins, ET rates are governed by the bond structures: the electrons, in effect, tunnel through the bonds comprising the chain structure of the proteins.

See also
 Electron equivalent
 Electrochemical reaction mechanism
 Solvated electron

References

Physical chemistry
Reaction mechanisms

zh:電子轉移